Ranch to Market Road 243 (RM 243) is a Ranch to Market Road in the U.S. state of Texas maintained by the Texas Department of Transportation (TxDOT). The road, first designated in 1945, is located in Burnet and Williamson counties in the Texas Hill Country and passes through the city of Bertram and the smaller communities of Oatmeal and Mahomet. The nearly  road has major intersections with RM 1174 and  US 183 at its termini and has short concurrencies with  SH 29 and again with RM 1174 in Bertram. RM 243 passes through a portion of a national wildlife refuge and crosses two forks of the San Gabriel River.

History
On July 14, 1949, the road was extended  to Oatmeal. US 183 was rerouted eastward south of Albany along a new route that includes the present section between Briggs and Austin at the Green's Corner terminus. On October 31, 1957, RM 243 received its current Ranch to Market designation and was extended  to RM 1174, which was extended southward from Bertram at the same time.

Route description
RM 243 begins at RM 1174 in Balcones Canyonlands National Wildlife Refuge in Burnet County. The road proceeds northward passing through Oatmeal before crossing the South Fork of the San Gabriel River, then turns to the northeast toward Bertram. In Bertram, RM 243 joins SH 29 to the southeast until turning back to the northeast along N. Grave St. joining RM 1174. On the north edge of town, RM 1174 separates to the north, then RM 243 leaves town to the northeast and crosses the North Fork of the San Gabriel River. The road then passes through Mahomet before it terminates immediately after crossing into Williamson County at US 183 between Liberty Hill and Biggs.

Major intersections

References

0243
Transportation in Burnet County, Texas
Transportation in Williamson County, Texas